Claude Pascal (Paris, February 19, 1921 – Paris, February 28, 2017) was a French composer.

After studying at the Conservatoire de Paris, he obtained the 1945 Premier Prix de Rome for the cantata, La farce du contre Bandier. After a brief period as conductor of the Opéra-Comique, Pascal became professor at the Paris Conservatoire in 1952, a position he held until his retirement in 1987. From 1969 to 1979 he worked as a music critic for Le Figaro, and from 1983 to 1991 he was an expert on copyright issues at the Paris Court of Appeals.

Pascal's extensive work as a composer includes practically every musical genre. The discography of his works consists of more than thirty CDs. The musical estate of Claude Pascal is archived at the Bibliothèque Nationale de France.

Works
Quatuor à cordes, 1943
Octuor for wind instruments, 1944
Sonatine for alto saxophone and piano, 1947
1ère Sonate for violin and piano, 1947
Air varié for contrabass and piano, 1950
Pop-corn for violin and piano, 1951
Toccata for piano, 1952
Pastorale héroïque for trombone and piano, 1952
Pièce for oboe and piano, 1952
Sonatine for violin and piano, 1952
Impromptu for alto saxophone and piano, 1953
Improvisation en forme de canon for trombone and piano, 1958
Concerto for piano and chamber orchestra, 1958
Concerto for cello and orchestra, 1959
Musique pour harpe, 1960
Quatuor de saxophones, 1961
Ouverture pour un conte de fées for orchestra, 1961
2ème Sonate for violin and piano, 1963
Ut ou do, 5 pieces for children's choir, 1963
Sonate for horn and piano, 1963
Trois Légendes for clarinet and piano, 1963
Six Pièces variées for flute and piano, 1965
Six Pièces variées for clarinet and piano, 1965
Six Pièces variées for trumpet and piano, 1965
Sonate en 6 minutes 30 for tuba, bass trombone, or saxhorn and piano, 1966
Grave et Presto for cello and piano, 1966
Concerto for harp and orchestra, 1967
 Orchestration of The art of fugue by Johann Sebastian Bach (with Marcel Bitsch), 1967
Suite for piano, 1970
Sonate for cello and piano, 1971
Quatre Etudes for piano, 1980
Triptyque ferroviaire, 3 pieces for two-part children's choir, 1980
L'Invitation aux voyages, 5 pieces for three-part choir, 1981
Portrait de l'oiseau-qui-n'existe-pas, song for soprano and piano, 1981
Sonatine for piano, 1982
Suite française for cello solo, 1982
J'ai voulu te rejoindre, song for soprano and piano, 1982
Elégie for organ, 1986
Danse des Lutins for flute and piano, 1986
Offertoire for organ, 1986
Carnet de notes, 74 progressive pieces for piano, 1987
Sonate for violin solo, 1990
60 Petites Etudes for piano, 1991
Trois Inventions for flute quartet, 1991
Framboise et Amandine, les jumelles de l'espace, comic opera for children, 1992
Piano-rétro, 8 pieces for piano, 1992
Farfelettes, 10 pieces for children's choir and one or two instruments, 1993
Paraphrase sur "The Entertainer" by Scott Joplin for clarinet or alto saxophone and piano, 1994
Quatre Farfelettes for voice and piano, 1998
Sonate for horn solo, 1997
Trio for soprano or tenor flutes, 1997
Concerto for flute and string orchestra, 1996
Trois Etudes-Caprices for piano four-hands, 1998
Partita for alto saxophone and piano, 1999
Scherzetto for saxophone quartet, 2002
Sonate for two flutes, 2002
Suite chorégraphique, 5 pieces for saxophone quartet, 2003
Top-Model et Cie, 3 songs for soprano and piano, 2003
Eléments de solfège, 4 songs for voice and piano, 2003
Allegro, Choral et Fugato for horn quartet, 2004
Equinoxe for horn and piano, 2004
Notturno for violin and piano, 2005
Rituel tibétain for horn quartet, 2005
Sérénade for guitar, 2005
Concerto for alto saxophone and orchestra, 2006
Déjà 1 an !, song for voice and piano, 2006
Atout Chœur, 5 pieces for mixed choir and organ or piano, 2007
Entrée pour un mariage, Paraphrase of the Wedding March by Felix Mendelssohn for flute and organ, 2007

Bibliography 
"Claude Pascal", in Sax, Mule & Co, Jean-Pierre Thiollet, H & D, 2004, .

References 

Musicians from Paris
1921 births
2017 deaths
Conservatoire de Paris alumni
Academic staff of the Conservatoire de Paris
20th-century French composers
French male composers
French opera composers
Prix de Rome for composition
20th-century French male musicians